Linas is a Lithuanian male given name. It is the Lithuanian form of the name Linus, which derives from the Greek for "flax". The female equivalent is Lina. Linas may refer to:

People
Linas Adomaitis (born 1976), Lithuanian musician
Linas Alsenas (born 1979), American writer
Linas Balčiūnas (born 1978), Lithuanian cyclist
Linas Kleiza (born 1985), Lithuanian basketball player
Linas Klimavičius (born 1989), Lithuanian football player
Linas Linkevičius (born 1961), Lithuanian politician
Linas Pilibaitis (born 1985), Lithuanian football player

Other uses
Linas, Essonne, France
Monte Linas, Sardinia, Italy

See also
Lina
Linas-Montlhéry

References 

Lithuanian masculine given names